Qualifications for Men's artistic gymnastic competitions at the 2012 Summer Olympics were held at the North Greenwich Arena on July 28. The results of the qualification determined the qualifiers to the finals: 8 teams in the team final, 24 gymnasts in the all-around final, and 8 gymnasts in each of 6 apparatus finals. The competition was divided to 3 subdivisions. The first subdivision took place at 11:00 British Summer Time (UTC+1); the second and third subdivision at 15:30 BST and 20:00 BST respectively.

Subdivisions
Gymnasts from nations taking part in the team all-round event were grouped together while the other gymnasts were grouped into one of six mixed groups. The groups were divided into the three subdivisions after a draw held by the Fédération Internationale de Gymnastique. The groups rotated through each of the six apparatuses together.

Subdivision 1

Mixed Group 3

Mixed Group 4

Subdivision 2

Mixed Group 1

Mixed Group 5

Mixed Group 6

Subdivision 3

Mixed Group 2

Qualification results

Individual All-Around Event Qualifiers

Reserves
The reserves for the individual all-around event final were
 
 
 
 

Only two gymnasts from each country may advance to the All Around Final. Therefore, in some cases, a third gymnast placed high enough to qualify, but did not advance to the final because of the quota. Gymnasts who did not advance to the Final, but had high enough scores to do so were:
  (17th place)
  (20th place)
  (22nd place) (ended up replacing Yamamuro, who was injured after the Team Final)
  (26th place)

Floor event qualifiers

Reserves
The reserves for the floor event final were

Men's Pommel Horse Qualifiers

Reserves
The reserves for the pommel horse event final were

Men's Still Rings qualifiers

At 39 years old, Yordan Yovchev was the oldest of all the competitors in the artistic gymnastics events at the 2012 Summer Olympics. He and Oksana Chusovitina share the record for competing at the greatest number of Olympic Games – for both artistic gymnasts, the 2012 Summer Olympics in London was their 6th time as Olympians.

Reserves
The reserves for the still rings event final were:

Vault qualifiers

Reserves
The reserves for the vault event final were

Parallel Bars qualifiers

Reserves
The reserves for the parallel bars event final were

Horizontal Bar qualifiers

Reserves
The reserves for the horizontal bars event final were

References

Gymnastics at the 2012 Summer Olympics
2012
Men's events at the 2012 Summer Olympics